The Kroeber M4 Köller was a 2-stroke air-cooled horizontally-opposed piston engine designed and built by Dr. Kroeber & Sohn G.m.b.H. in Germany in the late 1930s. The M4 proved relatively popular, for powering the ultra-light aircraft and motor-gliders in vogue during the 1920s and 1930s.

Variants
Kroeber M3 Köllereither a typo or a variant of the M4, (only reference is Cynk's Polish aircraft 1893-1939)
Kroeber M4 KöllerMain production variant

Applications
Data from:AEHS : HOAE Kroeber
 Grunau Motor-Baby - German motor-glider conversion of a Grunau Baby
 Kocjan Bąk I - Polish motorglider
 Dittmar Condor 'La Falda' (a removable power-egg with M4 and pusher propeller)
 Möller Stomo 3 - German high-speed ultralight aircraft
 Akaflieg München Mü13M Motormerlin 
 ITS-8 - Polish motorglider sic Kroeber M3 Köller (only reference to M3)

Engines on display
There are several M4 engines on display, but one of the best preserved and presented is at the Polish Aviation Museum in Krakow.

Specifications (M4)

References

Boxer engines
M4
1930s aircraft piston engines